Badmeaningood Vol.2 is a compilation of tracks chosen by alternative hip hop artist, Roots Manuva. The series was started by the author A. W. Wilde and released on Whoa Music / Ultimate Dilemma.

Track listing

 Roots Manuva - "Intro" – 2:06
 Deckwrecka feat. MCD - "Priceless" – 3:29
 Fallacy & Fusion - "The Groundbreaker" – 3:21
 Willie Hutch - "(I'm Gonna) Hold On" – 3:34
 The Beat - "Mirror in the Bathroom" – 2:59
 Ce'Cile - "Sweetest Feeling" – 2:42
 Bad Vibes & Potential Bad Boy - "Bad Boy" (DJ Mix) - 3:26
 Sugar Minott - "Crazy Sound Boy" – 3:46
 Ol' Dirty Bastard feat. Mack 10 & Royal Flush - "Caught Up" – 3:27
 Braintax feat. Task Force - "Godnose" – 3:59
 Eric B and Rakim - "Follow the Leader" – 3:32
 N.W.A. - "Straight Outta Compton" – 2:44
 Soul II Soul - "Keep on Movin'" – 3:09
 Freeez - "I.O.U." – 3:42
 Juicy - "Sugar Free" – 2:36
 Lucy Pearl - "Can't Stand Your Mother" – 3:34
 Outkast - "Elevators (Me & You)" – 3:56
 Roots Manuva - "Yellow Submarine" – 2:55
 Reachout - "Stimulation of Chaos (instrumental)" – 3:51

See also 
 Badmeaningood Vol.1 (2002, by Skitz)
 Badmeaningood Vol.3 (2003, by Peanut Butter Wolf)
 Badmeaningood Vol.4 (2003, by Scratch Perverts)

Hip hop compilation albums
2002 compilation albums